RFA Brambleleaf (A81) was a  support tanker of the Royal Fleet Auxiliary. Originally built as MV Hudson Deep she was chartered by the Ministry of Defence in 1980.

Operational history
In April 1982, Brambleleaf was diverted from Armilla Patrol duties in the Persian Gulf for service during the Falklands Conflict.

On 18 November 1983, Brambleleaf sailed along with the assault ship HMS Fearless to support Operation Offcut, providing naval support for British troops in the multi-national force in the Lebanon.

In 2003, Brambleleaf was one of 13 RFA ships deployed in support of the second Gulf War.

On 18 August 2009 she was towed to Ghent for scrapping.

References

 

Tankers of the Royal Fleet Auxiliary
Leaf-class tankers
Falklands War naval ships of the United Kingdom
1976 ships